Gentleman of the Bedchamber was a title in the royal household of the Kingdom of England from the 11th century, later used also in the Kingdom of Great Britain.  A Lord of the Bedchamber was a courtier in the Royal Household; the term being first used in 1718.  The duties of the Lords and Gentleman of the Bedchamber originally consisted of assisting the monarch with dressing, waiting on him when he ate, guarding access to his bedchamber and closet and providing companionship. Such functions became less important over time, but provided proximity to the monarch; the holders were thus trusted confidants and often extremely powerful. The offices were in the gift of The Crown and were originally sworn by Royal Warrant directed to the Lord Chamberlain.

This is an incomplete list of noblemen who have served as Lord of the Bedchamber or Gentleman of the Bedchamber:

Description and functions
There were always several holders of the office, who were invariably gentlemen and almost invariably peers, often important ones, as the regular access to the monarch which the role brought was the most valuable commodity of the courtier.  The duties of the office involved waiting on the King when he ate in private, helping him to dress, guarding the bedchamber and water closet, and providing companionship.

From 1660 the office of first gentleman of the bedchamber was invariably combined with that of Groom of the Stool.  On average the number of Gentlemen varied around 12 but fluctuated from time to time. During the reign of James II there were only eight, and none were appointed during the reign of Queen Anne.

Gentlemen of the Bedchamber to James I of England (1603–1625)
1607–1615: Robert Carr
1611–1625: Robert Carey
1612–?: Henry Gibb
1615–?: George Villiers (died 1628)
1622–1625: John Murray

Gentlemen of the Bedchamber to Charles I of England (1625–1649)
1625–1640: James Erskine, 6th Earl of Buchan
1625–?: James Stewart
1625–1639: Robert Carey
?1625–? Richard Tichborne
?1625–? Gerard Fowke
1643–1649: Montagu Bertie
1647–1649: James Harrington

Gentlemen of the Bedchamber to Charles II of England (1660–1685)
1650–1657 & 1661–1667 & 1667–1674: George Villiers, 2nd Duke of Buckingham
1652–1677: William Crofts, 1st Baron Crofts
1660– Sir John Granville (later Earl of Bath) (and Groom of the Stole)
1660–1679: Charles Gerard, 1st Earl of Macclesfield
1660–1665: Thomas Wentworth, 5th Baron Wentworth
1660–1673: John Maitland, 2nd Earl of Lauderdale
1660–1677: William Cavendish, 1st Marquess of Newcastle (Duke of Newcastle from 1665)
1660–1670: George Monck, 1st Duke of Albemarle
1660–1666: James Butler, 1st Marquess of Ormonde (Duke of Ormonde from 1661)
1660–1666: Mountjoy Blount, 1st Earl of Newport
1661–?: Charles Stewart, 3rd Duke of Richmond (died 1672)
1662–1685: Henry Cavendish, Viscount Mansfield (Duke of Newcastle from 1676)
1665–1681: James Howard, 3rd Earl of Suffolk
1666–1681: Robert Montagu, Viscount Mandeville (Earl of Manchester from 1671)
1666–1680: Thomas Butler, 6th Earl of Ossory
1667–1680: John Wilmot, 2nd Earl of Rochester
1669–1685: Charles Sackville, Lord Buckhurst
1672–1683 (extra) & 1673–1682: John Sheffield, 3rd Earl of Mulgrave
1673–?: Christopher Monck, 2nd Duke of Albemarle (died 1688)
1673–1674: Lionel Cranfield, 3rd Earl of Middlesex
1673–1674 (extra) & 1674–?: Robert Spencer, 2nd Earl of Sunderland
1674–1685: Robert Bertie, 3rd Earl of Lindsey
1677–?: Aubrey de Vere, 20th Earl of Oxford (died 1703)
1679–?: Richard Jones, 1st Earl of Ranelagh (died 1712)
1679–1682 (extra) & 1682–1685: James Hamilton, Earl of Arran
1680–?: Peregrine Osborne, Viscount Latimer
1680–1685: Thomas Lennard, 1st Earl of Sussex
1682–1685: Louis de Duras, 2nd Earl of Feversham (extra)
1683–1685: Edward Lee, 1st Earl of Lichfield
1685: Thomas Bruce, Lord Bruce

Gentlemen of the Bedchamber to James II of England (1685–1688)
1669–1684: Francis Hawley, 1st Baron Hawley
1673–?: John Churchill, 1st Baron Churchill
1685–1687: Charles Seymour, 6th Duke of Somerset
1685–1688: Thomas Bruce, 2nd Earl of Ailesbury
1685–1688: Edward Lee, 1st Earl of Lichfield
1685–1688: Henry Somerset, 1st Duke of Beaufort
1685–1688: James Butler, Earl of Ossory
1685–?: John Sheffield, 3rd Earl of Mulgrave
1685–1688: Louis de Duras, 2nd Earl of Feversham
1687–?: George Douglas, 1st Earl of Dumbarton
1688: George FitzRoy, 1st Duke of Northumberland
1688: James Cecil, 4th Earl of Salisbury

Gentlemen of the Bedchamber to William III of England (1689–1702)
1689–1697: Charles Mordaunt, 1st Earl of Monmouth
1689–1699: James Butler, 2nd Duke of Ormonde
1689–?: Hon. H. Sydney
1689–?: Aubrey de Vere, 20th Earl of Oxford
1689–?: John Churchill, 1st Baron Churchill
1689–?: Richard Lumley, 2nd Viscount Lumley (Earl of Scarbrough from 1690)
1689–1700: Henry Sydney, 1st Earl of Romney
1689–?: John Holles, 4th Earl of Clare
1689–?: James Douglas, Earl of Drumlanrig
1689–1702: Charles Douglas, 2nd Earl of Selkirk
1691–1702: Algernon Capell, 2nd Earl of Essex
1692–1693: Charles Granville, Viscount Granville
1692–1702: Robert Sutton, 2nd Baron Lexinton
1697–1702: Charles Boyle, 4th Viscount Dungarvan (Earl of Cork and Burlington from 1698)
1699–1702: Charles Butler, 1st Earl of Arran
1699–1702: James Hamilton, 4th Duke of Hamilton
1700–1702: Charles Howard, 3rd Earl of Carlisle
1701–1702: Wriothesley Russell, 2nd Duke of Bedford
1701–1702: Arnold van Keppel, 1st Earl of Albemarle

Gentlemen of the Bedchamber to Prince George of Denmark (1702–1708)
1703–1705: Scroop Egerton, 4th Earl of Bridgwater
1704–?: Thomas Fane, 6th Earl of Westmorland
1706–1708: Thomas Howard, 6th Baron Howard of Effingham
1708: Henry Clinton, 7th Earl of Lincoln
?–?: Archibald Primrose, 1st Earl of Rosebery

Gentlemen and Lords of the Bedchamber to George I of Great Britain (1714–1727)

Lord
 1721–1723: 2nd Earl of Bute

Gentlemen
1714–1716: Henry Grey, 1st Duke of Kent
1714–1716: Charles Boyle, 4th Earl of Orrery
1714–1717: Charles FitzRoy, 2nd Duke of Grafton
1714–1721: John Carteret, 2nd Baron Carteret
1714–1722: Charles Montagu, 4th Earl of Manchester (Duke of Manchester from 1719)
1714–1723: Charles Lennox, 1st Duke of Richmond
1714–1727: James Berkeley, 3rd Earl of Berkeley
1714–1727: Henry Clinton, 7th Earl of Lincoln
1714–1727: John Dalrymple, 2nd Earl of Stair
1714–1727: Charles Douglas, 2nd Earl of Selkirk
1716–1723: Francis Godolphin, 2nd Earl of Godolphin
1716–1727: George Hamilton, 1st Earl of Orkney
1717–1727: John Sidney, 6th Earl of Leicester
1717–1726: Henry Bentinck, 1st Duke of Portland
1717–1727: Henry Lowther, 3rd Viscount Lonsdale
1719–1721: Edward Rich, 7th Earl of Warwick
1719–1721: Robert Darcy, 3rd Earl of Holderness
1719–1727: Scroop Egerton, 4th Earl of Bridgwater (Duke of Bridgwater from 1720)
1719–1727: Peregrine Bertie, Marquess of Lindsey
1720–?: Charles Douglas, 3rd Duke of Queensberry
1720–1723: Anthony Grey, Earl of Harold
1721–1727: John Manners, 3rd Duke of Rutland
1721–1727: William Montagu, 2nd Duke of Manchester
1722–1727: Talbot Yelverton, 1st Earl of Sussex
1723–?: Henry Roper, 8th Baron Teynham
1723–1727: Charles Townshend, Lord Lynn
1723–?: James Waldegrave, 1st Earl Waldegrave
1725–?: John West, 7th Baron De La Warr
1726–1727: Charles Lennox, 2nd Duke of Richmond
1727: James Hamilton, 5th Duke of Hamilton

Lords and Gentlemen of the Bedchamber to George II of Great Britain (1714–1760)

Lords
 1722–1751: 2nd Earl of Albemarle; appointed when Prince of Wales.
 1727–1730: Lord Philip Stanhope
 1727–1736: Thomas Paget, Lord Paget
 1727–1738: Lord William Manners
 1752–1760: George Coventry, 6th Earl of Coventry
 1757–1760: John Hobart, 2nd Earl of Buckinghamshire

Gentlemen
1714–1721: John Hamilton, 3rd Lord Belhaven and Stenton
1714–1722: Charles Paulet, 3rd Duke of Bolton
1714–1735: Henry Herbert, Lord Herbert (Earl of Pembroke from 1733)
1715–1730: Philip Stanhope, 4th Earl of Chesterfield
1718–1722: Edward Watson, Viscount Sondes
1719–1736: Henry Paget, Lord Paget
1727–1730: Henry Scott, 1st Earl of Deloraine
1727–?: William Capell, 3rd Earl of Essex
1727–1733: James Hamilton, 5th Duke of Hamilton
1727–1739: Charles Douglas, 2nd Earl of Selkirk
1727–?: Hugh Fortescue, 1st Earl Clinton
1727–?: James Waldegrave, 1st Earl Waldegrave
1731–1752: John Murray, 2nd Earl of Dunmore
1733–1755: John Poulett, 2nd Earl Poulett
1733–1747: William Clavering-Cowper, 2nd Earl Cowper
1735–1751: Simon Harcourt, 2nd Viscount Harcourt (Earl Harcourt from 1749)
1737–?: Charles Bennet, 2nd Earl of Tankerville
1738–1743: Charles Spencer, 3rd Duke of Marlborough
1738–1755: William Nassau de Zuylestein, 4th Earl of Rochford
1738–1751: Charles Beauclerk, 2nd Duke of St Albans
1738–1760: Thomas Belasyse, 4th Viscount Fauconberg (Earl Fauconberg from 1756)
1739–1760: Robert Montagu, 3rd Duke of Manchester
1741–1751: Robert Darcy, 4th Earl of Holderness
1741–?: Evelyn Pierrepont, 2nd Duke of Kingston-upon-Hull
1743–1752: James Waldegrave, 2nd Earl Waldegrave
1743–1760: Henry Clinton, 9th Earl of Lincoln
1748–1760: John Ashburnham, 2nd Earl of Ashburnham
1751–1760: Francis Seymour-Conway, 1st Earl of Hertford
1751–1756: William FitzWilliam, 3rd Earl FitzWilliam
1751–1760: Charles Watson-Wentworth, 2nd Marquess of Rockingham
1752–?: James Carmichael, 3rd Earl of Hyndford
1753–1760: Hugh Percy, 1st Earl of Northumberland
1755–1760: Peregrine Bertie, 3rd Duke of Ancaster and Kesteven
1755–1760: William Capell, 4th Earl of Essex
1755–1760: George Walpole, 3rd Earl of Orford
1756–1757: John Hobart, 2nd Earl of Buckinghamshire

Gentlemen of the Bedchamber to Frederick, Prince of Wales (1729–1751)
1729–1731: John Ashburnham, 1st Earl of Ashburnham
1729–1742: Henry Brydges, Marquess of Carnarvon
1729–1730: Lord Charles Cavendish
1729–1751: Harry Paulet, 4th Duke of Bolton
1730–1733: Charles Bennet, 2nd Earl of Tankerville
1730–1751: Francis North, 4th Baron Guilford
1731–1749: Charles Calvert, 5th Baron Baltimore
1733–1738: William Villiers, 3rd Earl of Jersey
1738–1751: Charles Douglas, 3rd Duke of Queensberry
1742–1743: George Montagu-Dunk, 2nd Earl of Halifax
1742–1745: Edward Bligh, 2nd Earl of Darnley
1744–1751: William O'Brien, 4th Earl of Inchiquin
1747–1750: Arthur St Leger, 3rd Viscount Doneraile
1748–1751: John Perceval, 2nd Earl of Egmont
1749–1751: Lord Robert Manners-Sutton
1750–1751: John Stuart, 3rd Earl of Bute

Lords and Gentlemen of the Bedchamber to George III of the United Kingdom (1751–1820)

Lords
 1747–1750: Arthur St Leger, 3rd Viscount Doneraile (to Prince George)
 1749–1751: Lord Robert Manners-Sutton (to Prince George)
 1751–1782: Lord Robert Bertie (1751–1760 to Prince George)
 1760–1761: George Lee, 3rd Earl of Lichfield
 1760–1767: John Hobart, 2nd Earl of Buckinghamshire
 1760–1770: George Coventry, 6th Earl of Coventry
 1761–1790: Edward Harley
 1767–1770: Norborne Berkeley, 4th Baron Botetourt
 1777–1783: Heneage Finch, 4th Earl of Aylesford
 1782–1803: George Pitt, 1st Baron Rivers
 1800–1810: John Townshend, 2nd Viscount Sydney
 1804–1819: George Pitt, 2nd Baron Rivers

Gentlemen
1760–1765: Peregrine Bertie, 3rd Duke of Ancaster and Kesteven
1760–1761: Robert Montagu, 3rd Duke of Manchester
1760–1762: Charles Watson-Wentworth, 2nd Marquess of Rockingham
1760–1761: Thomas Belasyse, 1st Earl Fauconberg
1760–1762: Henry Clinton, 9th Earl of Lincoln
1760–1762: John Ashburnham, 2nd Earl of Ashburnham
1760–1766: Francis Seymour-Conway, 8th Earl of Hertford
1760–1761: John Carmichael, 3rd Earl of Hyndford
1760–1762: Hugh Percy, 2nd Earl of Northumberland
1760–1761 & 1782–1799: William Capell, 4th Earl of Essex
1760–1782: George Walpole, 3rd Earl of Orford
1760–1763: Thomas Thynne, 3rd Viscount Weymouth
1760–1764: James Brydges, Marquess of Carnarvon
1760: Henry Dawnay, 3rd Viscount Downe
1760–1763: William Pulteney, Viscount Pulteney
1760–1776: Thomas Brudenell-Bruce, 2nd Baron Bruce
1760–1789: William Douglas, Earl of March
1760–1767: Alexander Montgomerie, 10th Earl of Eglinton
1761–1806?: Charles Lennox, 3rd Duke of Richmond
1761–1762: George Lee, 3rd Earl of Lichfield
1761–1763 & 1770–1780: Henry Herbert, 10th Earl of Pembroke
1762-?: Samuel Masham, 2nd Baron Masham
1762–1765 & 1768–1780: Frederick St John, 2nd Viscount Bolingbroke
1763–1781: George Fermor, 2nd Earl of Pomfret
1763–?: John Peyto-Verney, 14th Baron Willoughby de Broke
1763–1770: George Montagu, 4th Duke of Manchester
1763–1800: Basil Feilding, 6th Earl of Denbigh
1765–1765: Charles Cornwallis, 2nd Earl Cornwallis
1767–1796: John Ker, 3rd Duke of Roxburghe
1769–?: George Villiers, 4th Earl of Jersey (extra)
1776–1777: Francis Osborne, Marquess of Carmarthen
1777–1802: Henry Belasyse, 2nd Earl Fauconberg
1777–1812: George Finch, 9th Earl of Winchilsea
1780–1814: George Onslow, 4th Baron Onslow (later Earl of Onslow)
1780–1820: Frederick Irby, 2nd Baron Boston
1783–1806: John Stewart, 7th Earl of Galloway
1789–1795: John West, 4th Earl De La Warr
1790–1815: Thomas Noel, 2nd Viscount Wentworth
1795–1819: John Poulett, 4th Earl Poulett
1797–?: George Parker, 4th Earl of Macclesfield
1799–?: John Somerville, 15th Lord Somerville
1802–? & 1804–1813: William Amherst, 2nd Baron Amherst
1803–? George Nugent, 7th Earl of Westmeath
1804–1812: Charles Perceval, 2nd Baron Arden
1804–?: Alleyne FitzHerbert, 1st Baron St Helens
1812–1820: James Murray, 1st Lord Glenlyon
1812–1820: Charles Stanhope, 4th Earl of Harrington

Lords and Gentlemen of the Bedchamber to George IV of the United Kingdom (1780–1830)

Lord
 1812–1828: Peniston Lamb, 1st Viscount Melbourne

Gentlemen
1780–1784: James Stopford, 2nd Earl of Courtown
1780–1781: Lord John Pelham-Clinton
1780–?: George Parker, Viscount Parker
1782–1783: George Legge, Viscount Lewisham
1783–1796: Peniston Lamb, 1st Viscount Melbourne
1784–1795: George Ashburnham, Viscount St Asaph
1789–?: William Fortescue, 1st Earl of Clermont
1814–1830: Charles William Vane, 3rd Marquess of Londonderry
1819–1821: James Duff, 4th Earl Fife
1820–1825: Frederick Irby, 2nd Baron Boston
1820–1823 & 1829–1830: William Amherst, 1st Earl Amherst
1820–1829: Charles Stanhope, 4th Earl of Harrington
1820–1830: James Murray, 1st Baron Glenlyon
1826–1830: Charles Gordon, Lord Strathavon
1827–1830: James Duff, 4th Earl Fife
1828–1830: Henry Greville, 3rd Earl of Warwick
1829–1830: Richard Curzon-Howe, 1st Earl Howe

Lords and Gentlemen of the Bedchamber to William IV of the United Kingdom (1830–1837)

Lords of the Bedchamber to King William IV (1830–1837)
 1830–18: Lord St. Helens
 1830–1832: Lord Glenlyon
 1830–18: Lord Lovaine
 1830: Lord Strathaven
 1830–1835: Earl of Fife
 1830–1832: Lord Clinton
 1830–18: Earl of Warwick
 1830–1831: Earl of Roden
 1830–18: Earl of Chesterfield
 1830–1835: Earl Amherst
 1830–1837: Lord James O'Bryen
 1830–1831: Marquess of Hastings
 1830–1833: Earl of Denbigh
 1831–1834: Earl of Gosford
 1831–1835: Marquess of Queensbury
 1830–1831: Earl of Waldegrave
 1831–-1837: Lord Lilford
 1832–1837: Viscount Ashbrook
 1832–1836: Lord Elphinstone

Gentlemen
1835–1837: James Duff, 4th Earl Fife
1830–?: Lord James O'Brien
1830–?: William Napier, 9th Lord Napier
1830–1837: George Byron, 7th Baron Byron
1830–1837: Lucius Cary, 10th Viscount Falkland
1833–1837: Lord Adolphus FitzClarence
1834–1835 & 1835–1837: George Byng, 7th Viscount Torrington
1834–?: Alan Gardner, 3rd Baron Gardner
1834–1837: William Bury, Lord Tullamore
1834–1837: Lord Ernest Brudenell-Bruce
1834–1837: George Holroyd, 2nd Earl of Sheffield
1835–1837: James Grimston, 1st Earl of Verulam
1835–1837: Philip Sidney, 1st Baron De L'Isle and Dudley
1835–1837: John Townshend, 3rd Viscount Sydney
1835–1837: George Douglas, 17th Earl of Morton
1835–1837: Thomas Taylour, 2nd Marquess of Headfort
1835–1837: Arthur Chichester, 1st Baron Templemore
1836–1837: Lord John Gordon

Lords of the Bedchamber to Prince Albert (1840–1861)
1840–1861: Lord John Lennox
1859–1861: Henry Cavendish, 3rd Baron Waterpark

Lords of the Bedchamber to Edward, Prince of Wales, later King Edward VII (1866–1901)
1866–1883: James Hamilton, 2nd Duke of Abercorn
1872–1901: Charles Harbord, 5th Baron Suffield
Following Edward's accession to the throne, Baron Suffield was gazetted as a "Lord in Waiting" to the King.

Lords of the Bedchamber to George, Prince of Wales (1901–1910), later King George V (1910-1936)
1901–?: Beilby Lawley, 3rd Baron Wenlock
1901–1907: Charles Cavendish, 3rd Baron Chesham
1908–1910: Luke White, 3rd Baron Annaly
Following George's accession to the throne, Baron Annaly was initially gazetted as "Lord of the Bedchamber in Waiting" to the king; but was subsequently referred to as "Lord in Waiting".

See also
Grand Chamberlain of France, who would oversee the French king's entertainments and physicians.
Lady of the Bedchamber (equivalent position in the time of a Queen regnant)
Groom of the Robes
Groom of the Stool

References

Sources
Burke's Peerage
A Political Index to the Histories of Great Britain and Ireland

Positions within the British Royal Household
Gendered occupations